Madison Township is one of fourteen townships in Morgan County, Indiana, United States. As of the 2010 census, its population was 9,705 and it contained 3,608 housing units.

Geography

Cities, towns, villages
 Mooresville (east edge)

Unincorporated towns
 Crestview Heights at 
 Fields at 
 Five Points at 
 Landersdale at 
 Miller at 
 Wiser at 
(This list is based on USGS data and may include former settlements.)

Cemeteries
The township contains these two cemeteries: Mount Olive and Silon.

Airports and landing strips
 Owen Field

Lakes
 Leona Lake
 Popular Grove Lake
 Lambert Lake

School districts
 Mooresville Consolidated School Corporation

Political districts
 Indiana's 9th congressional district
 State House District 47
 State House District 91
 State Senate District 35
 State Senate District 37

References
 
 United States Census Bureau 2008 TIGER/Line Shapefiles
 IndianaMap

External links
 Indiana Township Association
 United Township Association of Indiana
 City-Data.com page for Madison Township

Townships in Morgan County, Indiana
Townships in Indiana